Louis-Mathieu Langlès (23 August 1763 – 28 January 1824) was a French academic, philologist, linguist, translator, author, librarian and orientalist.  He was the conservator of the oriental manuscripts at the Bibliothèque Nationale in Napoleonic France and he held the same position at the renamed Bibliothèque du Roi after the fall of the empire.

Early life
Langlès was born in 1763 in Pérennes, a section of the commune of Welles-Pérennes in the department of the Oise.  His youthful efforts to obtain a military position were unsuccessful.  Instead, he went to Paris where he enrolled at the Collège de France, studying Arabic and Persian.

Scholarly career
Along with Antoine Léonard de Chézy (1773–1832), Jean-François Champollion (1790–1832) and Jean-Pierre Abel-Rémusat (1788–1832), Langlès was a pupil and protégé of Silvestre de Sacy (1758–1838). Langlès's close links with the Collège de France were enhanced by Baron de Sacy's support, which also resulted in Chézy becoming the Collège's first Professor of Sanskrit, Rémusat becoming its first Professor of Chinese, and Champollion becoming its first Professor of Egyptology.  The faculty encompassed Langlès as the college's Professor of Persian.

In 1785, he was attached to the Tribunal of the Marshals of France, which was at that time charged with suppressing duels.

In 1795, Langlès became the founder-director the Ecole des langues orientales vivantes in Paris, which is still operating under the revised name of Institut national des langues et civilisations orientales (INALCO).

Langlès was the provisional specialist on India at the Bibliothèque Nationale.  France became a center for Indian studies when the accumulated Indian manuscripts languishing in the Bibliothèque Nationale began to be inventoried.

Langlès corresponded with William Jones in Calcutta; and he was responsible for including the history and bibliography of the early publications of the Asiatic Society of Bengal in the third volume of the Magasin Encyclopédique.

The 1811 edition of Jean Chardin's Voyages de monsieur le chevalier Chardin en Perse et autres lieux de l'Orient (The Travels of Sir John Chardin in Persia and the Orient), was edited by Langlès. This is still today considered the standard version of Chardin's work. In 1819, he was elected to the American Philosophical Society in Philadelphia.

He died in Paris at the age of 81.  His remains are interred in Père-Lachaise cemetery.

Honors and awards
 Institut de France, Chevalier.
 Académie des inscriptions et belles-lettres (Academy of Humanities)
 Légion d'honneur.
 Royal Asiatic Society, United Kingdom.
 Asiatic Society of Bengal
 Order of St. Vladimir, Russia.

Selected works
 1787 – Political and Military Institutions of Tamerlane.
 1788 – History of the Mahrattas.
 1790 – Alphabet Tartare Manchou.
 1790 – Tartare Manchou Française.

See also
 Isaac Titsingh
 Chrétien-Louis-Joseph de Guignes

Notes

References

 Garcin de Tassy, Joseph-Héliodore-Sagesse-Vertu. (1997).  Muslim Festivals in India and Other Essays (ed., Mohammad Tariq Waseem). Oxford: Oxford University Press. 
 Langlès, Louis J.-S. Merlin, F. Merlin, Louis Édouard Gauttier du Lys d'Arc. (1825)  Catalogue des livres, imprimés et manuscrits, composant la bibliothèque de feu M. Louis-Mathieu Langlès: ... dont la vente se fera ... 24 mars 1825 et jours suivants. Paris: J. S. Merlin. 
 Redding, Cyrus. (1867).  Personal Reminiscences of Eminent Men. London: Saunders, Otley. 
 Raymond Schwab, Raymond. (1984).  The Oriental Renaissance: Europe's Discovery of India and the East, 1836-1886. New York: Columbia University Press. 
 Tourneux, Maurice. (1890).  Bibliographie de l'histoire de Paris pendant la Révolution française. Paris: Imprimerie nouvelle. OCLC 2077368

1763 births
1824 deaths
French librarians
French orientalists
French Iranologists
French translators
Translators from Persian
Linguists from France
Recipients of the Order of St. Vladimir
Members of the Académie des Inscriptions et Belles-Lettres
Recipients of the Legion of Honour
Burials at Père Lachaise Cemetery